N. truncatus may refer to:
 Neuroxena truncatus, a moth species found in Ghana
 Notonomus truncatus, a ground beetle species

See also 
 Truncatus (disambiguation)